DTD may stand for:

Technology
 Data transfer device, as found in AN/CYZ-10, a cryptographic device for receiving, storing, and transferring keys
 Detailed timing descriptor, a block containing supported output resolution details, part of the extended display identification data
 Document type definition, used in markup languages such as XML
 Desktop Tower Defense, a Flash-based strategy game
 Direct-to-disk recording, recording of audio or video to random access digital media as opposed to tape
 Danube–Tisa–Danube Canal, a water system in Serbia

Other uses
 DTD (TV station), a digital television station in Darwin, Northern Territory
 Dust-to-Digital, a record label specializing in American folk music
 December to Dismember, a former wrestling pay-per-view event
 Dekoratie voor Trouwe Dienst, a military decoration of the South African Defence Force between 1921 and 1946
 Delta Tau Delta, a U.S.-based college fraternity
 Developmental topographical disorientation, a cognitive disorder marked by inability to navigate within the environment
 Developmental Trauma Disorder also known as complex post-traumatic stress disorder, a possible result of childhood abuse
 Diastrophic dysplasia, an autosomal recessive dysplasia which affects cartilage and bone development
Dopamine transporter deficiency syndrome, an autosomal recessive Parkinsonism dystonia